NK ZET is a Croatian football club based in the city of Zagreb.

In the early 21st century, NK ZET has been competing in the Croatian Third Football League. They placed in the round of 16 in the 2005–06 Croatian Football Cup.

Former players
Marko Pjaca
Antonio Marin

References

Association football clubs established in 1927
Football clubs in Croatia
Football clubs in Zagreb
1927 establishments in Croatia